A general election was held in the U.S. state of Georgia on November 6, 2018. All of Georgia's executive officers were up for election as well as all of Georgia's fourteen seats in the United States House of Representatives. Neither U.S. Senate seat was up for election in 2018. The Republican Party won every statewide office in 2018.

Governor

Incumbent Republican Governor Nathan Deal was term-limited and unable to seek re-election to a third consecutive term.

Secretary of State Brian Kemp won the Republican nomination, defeating incumbent Republican Lieutenant Governor Casey Cagle in a runoff election. Georgia General Assembly Minority Leader Stacey Abrams won the Democratic nomination. Ted Metz ran for the Libertarian Party. Kemp beat Abrams following a very divisive campaign.

Lieutenant governor

Potential Republican candidates include Georgia Senate President Pro Tempore David Shafer, State Representative Geoff Duncan, Senate Majority Leader Bill Cowsert, State Senator Butch Miller, State Senator Burt Jones, Secretary of State Brian Kemp, Public Service Commissioner Tim Echols and former adjutant general of the Georgia National Guard Jim Butterworth.  State Representative Allen Peake was also speculated as a potential candidate, but has ruled out a bid.

As of November 2017, the declared Democratic candidate is Sarah Riggs Amico, an auto executive. Potential Democratic candidates include 2010 Attorney General nominee, former Dougherty County District Attorney Ken Hodges.

Democratic primary
 Sarah Riggs Amico, businesswoman
 Triana Arnold James, small business owner, and veteran

Primary results

Republican primary
 Geoff Duncan, state representative
 David Shafer, state senator
 Rick Jeffares, state senator

Primary results

Runoff results

General election

Attorney General
Incumbent Republican Attorney General Sam Olens resigned to become president of Kennesaw State University effective November 1, 2016, with Georgia Department of Economic Development Commissioner Christopher M. "Chris" Carr being appointed to serve the remainder of the term. Carr will be eligible to run for election to a full term in 2018.

Potential Republican candidates include State Senator Josh McKoon and former state representative B.J. Pak.

Potential Democratic candidates included State Representative Stacey Evans and former Georgia Judicial Qualifications Commission Chair Lester Tate.  2010 nominee and former Dougherty County District Attorney Ken Hodges was considered a potential candidate, but has decided to run for a seat on the Georgia Court of Appeals instead.  Columbus Mayor Teresa Tomlinson has ruled out running for attorney general. As of July 2018, Charlie Bailey, former Senior Assistant District Attorney in the Fulton County District Attorney's office, was running.

Democratic primary
 Charlie Bailey, former Fulton County Senior Assistant District Attorney

Primary results

Republican primary
 Chris Carr, incumbent

Primary results

General election
Governing magazine projected the race as "leans Republican".

Secretary of State

Incumbent Republican Secretary of State Brian Kemp ran for governor.

State Representative Buzz Brockway ran for the Republican nomination.  Other potential Republican candidates included Alpharetta Mayor David Belle Isle and State Senators Steve Gooch, John Albers and Michael Williams.

The Democratic nominee was former U.S. Representative from Georgia's 12th congressional district, John Barrow, who defeated Dee Dawkins-Haigler and Rakeim "RJ" Hadley in the primary.

The Libertarian candidate was Smythe Duval.  He won the nomination at the Georgia State Libertarian Convention in February 2018.

Democratic primary
 John Barrow, former U.S. Representative
 Dee Dawkins-Haigler, former state representative and candidate for the state senate in 2016
 RJ Hadley, former Rockdale County Tax Commissioner and candidate for U.S. Senate in 2010

Primary results

Republican primary
 David Belle Isle, Mayor of Alpharetta
 Buzz Brockway, state representative  
 Joshua McKoon, state senator
 Brad Raffensperger, state representative

Primary results

Runoff results

General election

Runoff results

Commissioner of Agriculture
Incumbent Republican Commissioner of Agriculture Gary Black is eligible to run for re-election to a third term in office.

Fred Swann is the Democratic candidate for Commissioner of Agriculture.

Democratic primary
 Fred Swann

Primary results

Republican primary
 Gary Black, incumbent

Primary results

General election

Commissioner of Insurance
Incumbent Republican Commissioner of Insurance Ralph Hudgens is not running for re-election.

Cindy Zeldin, executive director of Georgians for a Healthy Future, is running for the Democratic nomination.

Donnie Foster won the Libertarian nomination for Insurance Commissioner at the Georgia Libertarian Convention in February 2018.

Democratic primary
 Janice Laws
 Cindy Zeldin, executive director of Georgians for a Healthy Future

Primary results

Republican primary
 Jim Beck, former Deputy Insurance Commissioner
 Jay Florence
 Tracy Jordan

Primary results

General election

Commissioner of Labor
Incumbent Republican Commissioner of Labor Mark Butler is eligible to run for re-election to a third term in office.

Democratic primary
 Richard Keatley 
 Fred Quinn

Primary results

Republican primary
 Mark Butler, incumbent

Primary results

General election

State Superintendent of Schools
Incumbent Republican State Superintendent of Schools Richard Woods is running for re-election to a second term in office.

Potential Democratic candidates include Georgia Association of Educators President Sid Chapman and former National PTA President Otha Thornton.

Democratic primary
 Sid Chapman, president of the Georgia Association of Educators 
 Sam Mosteller
 Otha E. Thornton Jr., former National PTA President

Primary results

Runoff results

Republican primary
 John Barge, former Georgia Superintendent of Schools
 Richard Woods, incumbent

Primary results

General election

Public Service Commission
Elections will be held for District 3 and District 5 of the Public Service Commission.

In District 3 Ryan Graham is the Libertarian candidate for Public Service Commission.  

In District 5 John Turpish is the Libertarian candidate for Public Service Commission.

District 3 Democratic primary
 Lindy Miller
 John Noel
 Johnny C. White

Primary results

District 3 Republican primary
 Chuck Eaton, incumbent

Primary results

District 3 General Election

Runoff results

District 5 Democratic primary
 Dawn A. Randolph
 Doug Stoner

Primary results

District 5 Republican primary
 John Hitchins III
 Tricia Pridemore, incumbent

Primary results

District 5 General Election

General Assembly

State Senate

All 56 seats in the Georgia State Senate are up for election in 2018.

State House

All 180 seats in the Georgia House of Representatives are up for election in 2018.

United States House of Representatives

All of Georgia's fourteen seats in the United States House of Representatives were up for election in 2018. Democrats flipped one seat that elected a Republican in the previous election, resulting in them holding 5 of the state's 14 seats.

Controversies
The gubernatorial race was particularly controversial during the 2018 elections, as Republican candidate Brian Kemp was also the Georgia Secretary of State, a position which involves overseeing the electoral process, leading to allegations of conflicts of interests. Despite calls from Georgia Democrats, organizations such as the NAACP and Common Cause, and former president Jimmy Carter, Kemp did not relinquish the position until after the election.

Accusations were also leveled at Kemp with regards to the purging of voter rolls that was done under his oversight. Removing names from voter rolls is a common practice in the case of voters who are deceased or have moved out of state, but since 2017, the practice has spiked in Georgia. Due to strict voting rules in Georgia, tens of thousands of citizens lost their right to vote because of otherwise trivial issues, such as small differences between pieces of identification or insufficiently similar signatures. Kemp was accused of using the voter roll purge as a tactic to disenfranchise more than half a million people, predominantly African-Americans, which has been likened to voter suppression.

References

External links
Candidates at Vote Smart 
Candidates at Ballotpedia
Campaign finance at OpenSecrets

Official Attorney General campaign websites
Charlie Bailey (D) for Attorney General
Chris Carr (R) for Attorney General

Official Commissioner of Agriculture campaign websites
Gary Black (R) for Agriculture Commissioner
Fred Swann (D) for Agriculture Commissioner

Official Insurance and Safety Fire Commissioner campaign websites
Jim Beck (R) for Agriculture Commissioner
Janice Laws (D) for Agriculture Commissioner

Official Commissioner of Labor campaign websites
Mark Butler (R) for Labor Commissioner

Official State Superintendent of Schools campaign websites
Otha Thornton (D) for State Superintendent
Richard Woods (R) for State Superintendent

Official Public Service Commission district 3 campaign websites
Chuck Eaton (R) for Public Service Commissioner
Lindy Miller (D) for Public Service Commissioner

Official Public Service Commission district 5 campaign websites
Tricia Pridemore (R) for Public Service Commissioner
Dawn Randolph (D) for Public Service Commissioner

 
Georgia